Charles Box (born February 24, 1951) was elected mayor of Rockford, Illinois in 1989, the 2nd largest city in the state.  A Democrat, Box was the first African-American Mayor elected in Rockford.  Box was elected to three terms as mayor before choosing not to run in 2001.  In 2006, Illinois Governor Rod Blagojevich appointed Box as head of the Illinois Commerce Commission.

References

External links
 

1951 births
Living people
Mayors of Rockford, Illinois
Illinois Democrats
African-American mayors in Illinois
21st-century African-American people
20th-century African-American people